Not Bad for No Tour is a promotional EP by rock band R.E.M. Marketed to radio stations around the same time as R.E.M.'s Reveal, it contained audio versions of six songs, four of which appeared in original form on Reveal, as well as video of six songs, five being performed live.

Hundreds of copies were given away by Chicago radio station WXRT.

Track listing
The audio portion consisted of six songs:

"All The Way To Reno" (edit)
"All The Way To Reno" (recorded live by Pat McCarthy at the Museum of Television and Radio, New York City, on May 18, 2001 for Y100)
"She Just Wants To Be" (recorded live by Pat McCarthy at the Museum of Television and Radio, New York City, on May 18, 2001 for Y100)
"The One I Love" (recorded live by Jamie Candiloro of MMM, Sydney on June 1, 2001)
"So. Central Rain" (recorded live by Jamie Candiloro at France Inter, Studio 104, Paris on May 7, 2001)
"Beat A Drum" (Recorded live by Jamie Candiloro at the Museum of Television and Radio, Los Angeles on June 8, 2001 for WXRT)

The video portion consisted of six songs in QuickTime video format and an introduction by filmmaker Michael Moore:

 All The Way To Reno (filmed at Bishop Ford High School, Brooklyn, New York)
 Imitation of Life (filmed live in Cologne by MTV Networks Europe on May 12, 2001)
 Losing My Religion (recorded on April 29, 2001 at South Africa Freedom Day Concert On The Square, London)
 Find The River (filmed live in New York City by MTV for MTV Unplugged on May 21, 2001)
 I've Been High (filmed in Sydney for Channel V. "By Demand" on May 31, 2001)
 The Lifting (filmed live in Toronto for MuchMusic on May 17, 2001)

2001 EPs
R.E.M. live albums
R.E.M. EPs
Live EPs
2001 live albums
Warner Records EPs
Warner Records live albums
Albums produced by Pat McCarthy (record producer)
Albums produced by Mike Mills
Albums produced by Michael Stipe
Albums produced by Peter Buck